11066 Sigurd, provisional designation , is a stony, rare-type asteroid and elongated contact binary, classified as near-Earth object of the Apollo group of asteroids, approximately 2.5 kilometers in diameter.

It was discovered on 9 February 1992 by American astronomer couple Carolyn and Eugene Shoemaker at Palomar Observatory, California, and named after Sigurd, a hero from Norse mythology.

Orbit and classification 

Sigurd orbits the Sun in the inner main-belt at a distance of 0.9–1.9 AU once every 1 years and 8 months (600 days). Its orbit has an eccentricity of 0.38 and an inclination of 37° with respect to the ecliptic. Both observations remained unused. The body's observation arc begins with its official discovery observation at Palomar in 1992.

Physical characteristics 

In the SMASS taxonomy, Sigurd is a relatively rare K-type asteroid, which fall into the broader stony S-complex. It has also been grouped into the common S-type asteroid. The ExploreNEOs Warm Spitzer program, using the NASA Infrared Telescope Facility on Mauna Kea Observatory in Hawaii, classifies Sigurd as a Sr-type, which transitions to the R-type asteroids.

Contact binary 

Radiometric observations at Arecibo Observatory revealed that Sigurd is a contact binary, composed of two lobes in contact with each other. The more or less ellipsoidal lobes are elongated and joined on their long axis. The body has an axial tilt of 50° to 130°. The observing astronomers also note, that more than 10% of all larger (> 200 meters) near-Earth objects observed by radar are such contact binaries.

Photometry 

Rotational lightcurves obtained from photometric observations by Petr Pravec, Brian Warner and by a group of German and Ukrainian astronomers, gave a well-defined rotation period of 8.4958 to 8.51 hours. The analysis of the constructed lightcurves also gave a high brightness amplitude between 0.97 and 1.15 magnitude, which is indicative that Sigurd has a non-spheroidal shape.

Diameter and albedo 

According to the survey carried out by NASA's Wide-field Infrared Survey Explorer with its subsequent NEOWISE mission, Sigurd measures between 2.10 and 2.778 kilometers in diameter and its surface has an albedo of 0.190 and 0.29, respectively. Observations by the ExploreNEOs survey give a higher albedo of 0.38. The Collaborative Asteroid Lightcurve Link assumes an albedo of 0.18 and calculates a diameter of 2.86 kilometers with an absolute magnitude of 15.2, while radiometric observations of Sigurd gave an maximum dimensions of 4.2 kilometers.

Naming 

This minor planet was named after Sigurd, a legendary hero in Norse mythology. In the Völsunga saga, Sigurd rides through a ring of fire to awaken the shieldmaiden Brynhild, and later dies in a fight with Odin. Sigurd is also known as the dragon-slayer Siegfried in the German poem The Song of the Nibelungs. The approved naming citation was published by the Minor Planet Center on 23 May 2000.

References

External links 
 IAUC 5459 (discovery ), Central Bureau for Astronomical Telegrams, 27 February 1992 
 Contact Binary Asteroids and Comets, Robert Johnston, list at jonstonsarchive.net,  25 March 2017
 Binary and Ternary near-Earth Asteroids detected by radar, Lance A. M. Benner, ASA/JPL Asteroid Radar Research
 (11066) Sigurd at NEODyS-2 
 Asteroid Lightcurve Database (LCDB), query form (info )
 Dictionary of Minor Planet Names, Google books
 Asteroids and comets rotation curves, CdR Observatoire de Genève, Raoul Behrend
 
 
 

011066
Discoveries by Eugene Merle Shoemaker
Discoveries by Carolyn S. Shoemaker
Named minor planets
011066
011066
011066
19920209